GWO may refer to:
 Gdańskie Wydawnictwo Oświatowe, a Polish publishing house
 Gebrüder Weiss–Oberndorfer, an Austrian cycling team
 Google Website Optimizer
 Great-West Lifeco, a Canadian financial holding company
 Greenwood–Leflore Airport, in Mississippi